"The Typewriter" is a short composition of light music by American composer Leroy Anderson, which features an actual typewriter as a percussion instrument.

Composition
Anderson completed "The Typewriter" on October 9, 1950 in Woodbury, Connecticut. "The Typewriter" received its first performance on September 8, 1953 during a recording Anderson and the Boston Pops Orchestra made in New York City for Decca Records. Anderson composed the melody for symphony and pops orchestras; William Zinn and Floyd Werle arranged it for string orchestras and wind bands respectively.

Its name refers to the fact that its performance requires a typewriter, while using three basic typewriter sounds: the sound of typing, the "ring" of the carriage return indicating an approaching end-of-line (a standard desk bell is used for it), and the sound of the typewriter’s carriage returning. In some cases the sound of the typewriter’s carriage returning is made by a musical gourd, flute, string or other instrument.

The typewriter was modified so that only two keys work to prevent the keys from jamming. According to the composer himself, as well as other musicians, the typewriter part is difficult because of how fast the typing speed is: even professional stenographers cannot do it, and only professional drummers have the necessary wrist flexibility.

It has been called one of "the wittiest and most clever pieces in the orchestral repertoire". Author Steve Metcalf has written that "Despite the almost total disappearance of typewriters in everyday life, the statistics show that "The Typewriter" is still a favorite Anderson item."

The typewriter is considered a percussion instrument, and the typewriter part is usually performed by a percussionist or drummer, or rarely by the conductor.

In popular culture
The piece was featured in the Jerry Lewis film Who's Minding the Store (1963) and in the musical montage that opens Lewis' 1980 film Hardly Working, although his first recorded performance was on a January 1954 episode of The Colgate Comedy Hour. The Radio 4 satirical programme The News Quiz has adopted the tune as its theme song (though, oddly, in an arrangement not featuring a typewriter).

References

External links
The Typewriter played by Spanish percussionist Alfredo Anaya and Hamburg Symphony Orchestra directed by Miguel Roa.

Music and humour
Compositions by Leroy Anderson
1950 compositions
1953 in music
Typewriters